The FIA Super 2000 World Rally Championship (also SWRC) was a support championship of the World Rally Championship (WRC) that ran for three seasons from 2010 to 2012.

It was introduced to provide a series for the Super 2000 (S2000) specification of rally car, which in performance terms sat above the Group N level production cars and its Production World Rally Championship (PWRC), and the World Rally Car that dominated overall WRC results. Between 2007 and 2009, Super 2000 cars were permitted in the PWRC alongside Group N, with a noticeable gap in performance between the two. The creation of SWRC returned PWRC to a production car only series. SWRC also provided an FIA alternative to the Intercontinental Rally Challenge, which had gained in popularity and may have been a commercial threat to the WRC.

SWRC was replaced by the then new WRC2 Championship in 2013, after the Super 2000 cars were replaced by the FIA with Group R cars, specifically the R5.

For one season only in 2010, there was also a WRC Cup for Teams which was only for Super 2000 cars. However, this cup was not part of the Super 2000 championship even though many of the crews driving for the teams were. This may be attributed to the way the cup and championship were approved by and proposed to the World Motor Sport Council separately. With the new World Rally Car being based on Super 2000 rules, there was no strictly Super 2000 based cup or championship for teams in the following years as this was incorporated into the World Rally Championship.

Rules

Eligible rallies 
In 2010, 10 of the rallies of the World Rally Championship calendar made up the calendar of the SWRC. Entrants needed to register and nominate at that point which seven rallies they would be contesting, which must have included two of the three rallies on the calendar outside Europe. Failure to contest any of the nominated rallies would have resulted in exclusion from the championship.

In 2011, the SWRC calendar consisted of eight WRC rallies, with entrants having to nominate seven to contest. There was no explicit rule requiring leaving Europe, but as two rounds were outside Europe, one or both would need to have been entered.

In 2012, the criteria was similar but there was only one round outside of Europe, Rally New Zealand.

Points and championship classifications were accumulated in a similar way to the World Rally Championship.

Section sources:

Eligible cars

The following Super 2000 rally cars were eligible to compete in SWRC 2010–2012:
Fiat Grande Punto Abarth S2000
Ford Fiesta S2000
Peugeot 207 S2000
Škoda Fabia S2000
Mini John Cooper Works S2000
From 2011, the following R4 cars were also eligible:
Mitsubishi Lancer Evolution IX
Mitsubishi Lancer Evolution X
Subaru Impreza WRX STI 3rd Gen
Subaru WRX STI 4th Gen.
As derivatives of the Super 2000 car, the following Regional Rally Cars (RRC) were eligible to compete in 2012:
Citroën DS3 RRC
Ford Fiesta RS RRC

Results and statistics

Season reports, rally results and championship standings

Winners and runners up

FIA Super 2000 World Rally Championship for Drivers

FIA Super 2000 World Rally Championship for Co-Drivers

References

External links 
 SWRC at WRC.com (archived)
 SWRC at ewrc-Results.com
 SWRC at Jonkka's World Rally Archive

Rally racing series
World Rally Championship
Recurring sporting events established in 2010